The Piper's Call is the fifth solo album by master uilleann piper and prominent Irish traditional musician Liam O'Flynn. Produced by Arty McGlynn and Liam O'Flynn and recorded at Windmill Lane Studios in Dublin, the album was released on CD as well as video in 1999. There was also a television programme which was shown on PBS in the US and TG4 in Ireland.

Critical response

The mature O'Flynn piping style is a refined and stately thing, and this meditative fifth solo album The Piper's Call sees him out with Mark Knopfler and Galician piper, Carlos Núñez; great session men, Matt Molloy, Sean Keane, the pacepushing Steve Cooney and Arty McGlynn; with Micheál Ó Súilleabháin and the Irish Chamber Orchestra thrown in on one track. As such, with little need of the chord-barps of the regulators, O'Flynn concentrates on his beautifully controlled chanter work. The best tunes kick up their heels a bit, like McKenna's Reels and The Humours of Carrigaholt, showing O'Flynn's authority on the pipes at its most gorgeously alert; wrestling with Núñez in the jig-like muineiras; or the madness of Keane's fiddle cutting across The Gold Ring. It has its own moods and humours, but like the pipes themselves, this album very much grows on you.

Track listing
 "The Humours of Kiltyclogher, Julia Clifford's" – 4:10
 "The Pleasures of Hope, Rick's Rambles" – 3:54
 "An Droichead (The Bridge)" – 3:38
 "Miss Admiral Gordon's Strathspey" – 2:47
 "Sliabh na mBan (The Women's Mountain)" – 4:52
 "The Drunken Landlady, McKenna's Reels" – 3:30
 "Muiñeira de Poio / Muiñeira de Ourense" – 3:28
 "Bean Dubh an Ghleanna (The Dark Woman of the Glen)" – 6:12
 "The Humours of Carrigaholt Set" – 5:29
 "The Gold Ring" – 3:52
 "Marcha de Breixo / Marcha de Lousame" – 5:54

Personnel
 Liam O'Flynn – uilleann pipes, whistle
 Arty McGlynn – guitar
 Steve Cooney – guitar
 Rod McVey – keyboards, harmonium
 Liam Bradley – percussion
 Mark Knopfler – electric guitar
 Seán Keane – fiddle
 Matt Molloy – flute
 Carlos Núñez – gaita, ocarina, whistles
 Irish Chamber Orchestra – orchestra
 Fionnuala Hunt – artistic director 
 Ian Dakin – horns
 Fergus O'Carroll – horns
 Micheál O'Súilleabháin – orchestral arrangement

References

External links
 Record Label Catalogue 2010
 Album Sleevenotes

1999 albums
Liam O'Flynn albums